Boruto: Naruto Next Generations is a Japanese anime series based on the manga series of the same name and is a spin-off of and sequel to Masashi Kishimoto's Naruto. It is produced by Pierrot and broadcast on TV Tokyo. The anime is directed by Noriyuki Abe (#1–104), and Hiroyuki Yamashita (#1–66) and is written by Makoto Uezu (#1–66). Former manga writer Ukyō Kodachi supervised the story until episode 216.

Boruto follows the exploits of Naruto Uzumaki's son Boruto and his comrades from the Hidden Leaf Village's ninja academy while finding a path to follow once they grow up. Despite being based on the manga, the anime explores original storylines and adaptations of the spin-off manga, Naruto: The Seventh Hokage and the Scarlet Spring; Boruto: Naruto the Movie; as well as the Naruto Shinden light novel series.

It premiered on TV Tokyo on April 5, 2017 and aired every Wednesday at 5:55 PM JST. The series is also being released in DVDs. Viz Media licensed the series on March 23, 2017 to simulcast it on Hulu, and on Crunchyroll.

In the United States, the English dub made its premiere on Adult Swim's Toonami programming block on September 29, 2018. Adult Swim removed the series from the block's rotation after episode 52 on October 20, 2019. Adult Swim executive Jason DeMarco addressed on Twitter that they currently have no plans to bring the anime back.

The opening theme songs are "Baton Road" by Kana-Boon (episodes 1–26), "Over" by Little Glee Monster (episodes 27–51), and "It's All in the Game" by Qyoto (episodes 52–75).

The ending theme songs are "Dreamy Journey" by The Peggies (episodes 1–13), "Sayonara Moon Town" by Scenarioart (episodes 14–26), "Boku wa Hashiritsuzukeru" by Melofloat (episodes 27–39), "Denshin Tamashii" by Game Jikkyō-sha Wakuwaku Band (episodes 40–51), and "Kachō Fūgetsu" by Coalamode (episodes 52–63).



Episode list

Home releases

Japanese

English

Notes

References

Naruto episodes
Naruto lists